Bure Broads and Marshes is a  biological Site of Special Scientific Interest north-east of Norwich in Norfolk. Most of it is a Nature Conservation Review site, Grade I and National Nature Reserve. Two areas are nature reserves managed by the Norfolk Wildlife Trust, Cockshoot Broad and Ranworth Broad. It is part of the Broadland Ramsar site and Special Protection Area and The Broads Special Area of Conservation,

This is described by Natural England as a "nationally and internationally important wetland complex", which is situated on fenland peats in the floodplain of the River Bure. A notable feature is an extensive area of swamp alder carr on unstable peats and mud. There are a number of rare bird and butterfly species.

References

Sites of Special Scientific Interest in Norfolk
Special Protection Areas in England
Special Areas of Conservation in England
National nature reserves in England
Nature Conservation Review sites
Ramsar sites in England